Fernando Suárez del Solar (born December 8, 1955) is a Mexican-American peace activist.

Life
Suárez was born in Tenango del Aire in the State of Mexico. He moved from Tijuana, where he had relocated after his father's death, to Escondido, California, in 1997. His son, Marine Corps Lance Corporal Jesús Alberto Suárez del Solar Navarro, died in Iraq on March 27, 2003, being the first soldier of Mexican origin and the fifth Hispanic soldier killed in the invasion of Iraq. Despite having different dreams for his son, the Suárez family had moved to allow Jesús to fulfill his dream of becoming a Marine.

He traveled to Iraq in December 2003, visiting the place where his son died from an American cluster bomb. In 2006, he led a anti-war march from Tijuana to San Francisco, modeled after the Salt March of 1930.

See also
 Addicted To War
 Veterans For Peace
 Ron Kovic
 Documentary Film by Peter Lilienthal

References

External links
 http://www.latinola.com/story.php?story=1242
 https://web.archive.org/web/20080517010431/http://www.hispanicvista.com/HVC/Opinion/Guest_Columns/022805mariscal.htm
 http://www.alternet.org/waroniraq/37487/

American anti–Iraq War activists
Living people
People from Escondido, California
1955 births
Activists from California